Harold Lenoir Davis (October 18, 1894 – October 31, 1960), also known as H. L. Davis, was an American novelist and poet. A native of Oregon, he won the Pulitzer Prize for his novel Honey in the Horn, the only Pulitzer Prize for Literature given to a native Oregonian. Later living in California and Texas, he also wrote short stories for magazines such as The Saturday Evening Post.

Early life
Davis was born in Nonpareil, Douglas County, Oregon, in the Umpqua River Valley, and lived in Roseburg in his early years. His father was a teacher and the family moved frequently as he took up different teaching positions. They moved to Antelope, Oregon in 1906, and two years later they were in The Dalles, where his father was now a principal. In 1912 Davis graduated from high school there. He held various short-term jobs, with the county, with Pacific Power and Light, and in a local bank. He also worked as a railroad timekeeper and with a survey party near Mount Adams.

Writing career
His first poems were published in April 1919 in Poetry, edited by Harriet Monroe. These were eleven poems published together under the title Primapara. Later that year they won the magazine's Levinson Prize, worth $200. Davis also received a letter of praise from poet Carl Sandburg. Davis continued to publish poems in the magazine throughout the 1920s, and also sold some poems to H. L. Mencken's The American Mercury. Mencken encouraged him to begin writing prose.

In 1926, Davis and James Stevens privately published a small booklet, Status Rerum: A Manifesto Upon the Present Condition of Northwest Literature. Although only a few copies were printed, the booklet attracted notice because of its bluntness and invective against the local literary scene of Portland. Robinson Jeffers memorably described the pamphlet as a "rather grimly powerful wheel to break butterflies on."

Together with his new wife, the former Marion Lay of The Dalles, Davis moved to Seattle in August 1928. There he increased his literary efforts. His first published prose began appearing in The American Mercury in 1929. These were picturesque but hardly complimentary sketches of The Dalles and Eastern Oregon. One of the first was entitled "A Town in Eastern Oregon", a historical sketch of The Dalles. It caused quite a controversy in the region for its irreverence.

In 1932, Davis was awarded a Guggenheim Fellowship. The award allowed him to move to Jalisco, Mexico, where he lived for two years, concentrating on his writing. There he completed the novel Honey in the Horn, about southern Oregon pioneer life. It is a coming-of-age tale set in the early twentieth century. This novel received the Harper Prize for best first novel of 1935, together with a $7,500 cash award. It was well reviewed by writers such as Robert Penn Warren, although New Yorker critic Clifton Fadiman did not like it. The following spring the book won the Pulitzer Prize, and is the only Pulitzer Prize ever awarded to an Oregon born author. Davis did not go to New York to receive the Pulitzer in person, saying he did not want to put himself on exhibit.

The Davises bought a small ranch near Napa, California currently owned by Aaron and Claire Pott and is the estate vineyard known as Châteauneuf du Pott.  There Davis wrote short stories as his primary source of income, publishing them in such magazines as Collier's and The Saturday Evening Post. He continued to work on novels. His second novel, Harp of a Thousand Strings, appeared in 1941. The long interval from his Pulitzer-winning first novel meant that his second did not receive the notice it would have earlier. In fact, although Davis continued to improve as a writer, none of his later efforts received the attention of Honey in the Horn.

Davis was also undergoing crises in his life. He was divorced in 1943. He also changed publishers, from Harper & Brothers to William Morrow & Company, apparently because of a long-running dispute over royalty payments.

Later life
Over the next ten years, he published three more novels and a collection of earlier short stories. His fourth novel, Winds of Morning, was well received and became a Book of the Month Club selection. In 1953 he remarried, to Elizabeth Martin del Campo. As a result of arteriosclerosis, his left leg was amputated. He suffered chronic pain, but continued to write. In 1960 he died of a heart attack in San Antonio, Texas.

Evaluation
Although often considered a regional novelist, Davis rejected that evaluation. He undoubtedly used regional themes, but contended that he did so in the service of the universal. Influences on his work can be found in a wide range of American and European literature. His prose is considered wry, ironic, and cryptic. His stories are realistic, without the romantic stereotypes expected of "Western" fiction. The landscape is a major component of his novels.

Works
Honey in the Horn. New York, Harper & Brothers, 1935,  Also published as an Armed Services Edition
Proud Riders and Other Poems. New York, Harper & Brothers, 1942
Harp of a Thousand Strings (novel). New York, William Morrow & Co., 1941
Beulah Land (novel). New York, William Morrow & Company, 1949
Winds of Morning (novel). New York, William Morrow & Company, 1952, 
Team Bells Woke Me and Other Stories. William Morrow & Company, 1953, 
The Distant Music (novel). New York, William Morrow & Company, 1957, 
Kettle of Fire. New York, William Morrow & Company, 1957, 
The Selected Poems of H. L. Davis. Introduction by Thomas Hornsby Ferril, Boise, Idaho, Ahsahta Press, 1978,

Notes

External links
A short biography with a chronology
Discussion of his work
The Literary Encyclopedia
A brief biography
First Edition of Honey in the Horn (1936 Pulitzer Prize for Fiction)
A large collection of Davis's manuscripts and photographs reside at the Harry Ransom Center at the University of Texas at Austin.

1894 births
1960 deaths
People from Douglas County, Oregon
20th-century American novelists
Novelists from Oregon
Pulitzer Prize for the Novel winners
People from The Dalles, Oregon
American male novelists
20th-century American male writers
People from Roseburg, Oregon
Members of the American Academy of Arts and Letters